The U.S. state of New Hampshire has, since 1958, placed historical markers at locations that are deemed significant to New Hampshire history. The New Hampshire Division of Historical Resources (DHR) and the Department of Transportation (DOT) are jointly responsible for the historical marker program. The program is authorized by RSA 227 C:4, X, and RSA 236:40 to 44. , online documents maintained by DHR list 277 markers.

Markers
New Hampshire's historical markers are green with white text; the state seal sits atop each one. Generally, there is a title line and up to 12 lines of text, each of which has no more than 45 characters. Some markers note the year they were installed—it may be centered under the main text (early 2000s to present) or right-justified under the main text (1980s through early 2000s), although there are some visible exceptions—while on older markers it is not listed.

Any individual or group may propose a marker to commemorate significant New Hampshire places, persons, or events. Requests must be accompanied by a petition for the marker, signed by at least 20 New Hampshire citizens. The state's Division of Historical Resources has final decision rights for all markers. Markers funded by the state must be located along a state highway.  A "co-operative marker," which must be funded by whoever proposes it, can be located on a locally maintained road or on municipal land. , the state's website listed the cost of a marker at $2000 to $2500.

Markers generally have the same text on both sides, with some exceptions. Marker number one in Pittsburg only has text on one side. Marker number 122 in Carroll features the Mount Washington Hotel on one side and the Bretton Woods Monetary Conference on the other; several other markers also have different topics on each side. A few markers appear to have unique layouts:
 Number 127 in Portsmouth provides a two-part narrative on a single subject, with a "see other side" directive to the reader.
 Number 207 in Madison includes an image, that of the Gee Bee Model R-1 airplane, built by Granville Brothers Aircraft.
 Number 208 in Manchester has text on one side in English, and the same information on the other side in French.
 Number 236 in Concord discusses Civil War mustering on one side, and lists specific regiments on the other.

Marker status
A roster of markers, which is periodically published by the state, lists the status of each marker. The vast majority of markers are "Installed", while a few may be "Out for Repair". Several markers have been "Retired", which appears to indicate permanent removal. A New Hampshire Historical Highway Marker Advisory Committee has existed since the summer of 2020, "created and convened to complete a systematic review of existing markers for lack of historical context among other problems."

, the following markers have been listed as retired:
 Number 36 in Bow, which discussed an 1833 visit by Andrew Jackson
 Number 55 in Rumney, which discussed the 1712 destruction of "a Pemigewasset Indian village" and resulting "scalp bounty"
 Number 85 in Raymond, which discussed "the 1747 massacre of [three residents] by Indians of the Winnipesaukee Tribe"

Marker Quest
In May 2022, the Division of Historical Resources announced a Historical Highway Marker Quest program, encouraging people to visit the state's markers, and offering a free sticker to anyone who visits 10 markers and submits a form listing them.

Program status
Starting in July 2022, the state's website noted that the marker program was "temporarily on hold and not accepting new proposals" due to issues with the global supply chain and at the vendor's foundry. The notice was removed as of February 2023.

List of markers

The following pages list each marker, ordered by marker numbers as chronologically assigned by the state. Pages each contain 25 entries, noting each marker's city or town, and providing the text on the marker.
List of New Hampshire historical markers (1–25)
List of New Hampshire historical markers (26–50)
List of New Hampshire historical markers (51–75)
List of New Hampshire historical markers (76–100)
List of New Hampshire historical markers (101–125)
List of New Hampshire historical markers (126–150)
List of New Hampshire historical markers (151–175)
List of New Hampshire historical markers (176–200)
List of New Hampshire historical markers (201–225)
List of New Hampshire historical markers (226–250)
List of New Hampshire historical markers (251–275)
List of New Hampshire historical markers (276–300)

Markers by community
The below table alphabetically lists each city or town that has at least one historical marker. Detail of individual markers can be viewed via the above list of markers. The capital city of Concord has the most markers, with 14.

 denotes markers with a different inscription on each side

 denotes markers listed as "retired"

Notes

References

Further reading
RSA XIX 227-C:4 Historic Preservation Functions
RSA XX 236:40-48 Marking the Location of Public and Historic Incidents (Highway Regulations)
RSA XX 236:40 Historic Markers
RSA XX 236:41 Historic Preservation Office
RSA XX 236:44 Cooperative Markers

External links
New Hampshire Historical Highway Markers from New Hampshire Division of Historical Resources at NH.gov
Interactive map with marker photos at storymaps.arcgis.com
New Hampshire Historical Markers on Flickr
NewHampshire.com list of markers from August 2010 via Wayback Machine
Photos of historical markers by number from April 2016 via Wayback Machine